Ricardo Florin Farcaș (born 24 June 2000) is a Romanian professional footballer who plays as a centre back.

Club career

Ajax Amsterdam
He was the first Romanian footballer who played for Ajax Academy.

S.P.A.L.
He trained with the first team of SPAL for a short time in 2019.  On 27 January 2019 he sat on the bench in Seria A match against Parma FC.

Siena
Ricardo made his senior debut for Siena on 27 September 2020, in a 2–1 home victory over Ostiamare counting for the Serie D.

He made his Serie C debut  on 29 August 2021 in a game against Vis Pesaro.

Career statistics

Club

References

External links
 

2000 births
Living people
Sportspeople from Oradea
Romanian footballers
Association football defenders
Serie C players
Serie D players
A.C.N. Siena 1904 players
Romanian expatriate footballers
Romanian expatriate sportspeople in Italy
Expatriate footballers in Italy
Romania youth international footballers